The Château de Larroque is the remains of a 12th-century castle keep in the commune of Larroque in the Haute-Garonne département of France.

The property of the commune, it has been listed since 1930 as a monument historique by the French Ministry of Culture.

See also
List of castles in France

References

External links
 

Castles in Haute-Garonne
Monuments historiques of Haute-Garonne
Ruined castles in Occitania (administrative region)